Anastrangalia reyi sequensi is a subspecies of beetle from the family Cerambycidae, that can be found in such Asian countries as China, Japan, Kazakhstan, and Mongolia. The species have brown pronotum.

References

Lepturinae
Beetles described in 1898
Beetles of Asia